Schwandorf is an electoral constituency (German: Wahlkreis) represented in the Bundestag. It elects one member via first-past-the-post voting. Under the current constituency numbering system, it is designated as constituency 234. It is located in eastern Bavaria, comprising the districts of Cham and Schwandorf.

Schwandorf was created for the inaugural 1949 federal election. Since 2021, it has been represented by Martina Englhardt-Kopf of the Christian Social Union (CSU).

Geography
Schwandorf is located in eastern Bavaria. As of the 2021 federal election, it comprises the districts of Cham and Schwandorf as well as the Verwaltungsgemeinschaft of Wörth a.d.Donau from the Landkreis Regensburg district.

History
Schwandorf was created in 1949, then known as Burglengenfeld. It acquired its current name in the 1976 election. In the 1949 election, it was Bavaria constituency 20 in the numbering system. In the 1953 through 1961 elections, it was number 215. In the 1965 through 1972 elections, it was number 219. In the 1976 through 1998 elections, it was number 220. In the 2002 and 2005 elections, it was number 235. Since the 2009 election, it has been number 234.

Originally, the constituency comprised the independent city of Schwandorf and the districts of Burglengenfeld, Roding, Beilngries, Parsberg, and Riedenburg. In the 1965 through 1972 elections, it comprised the city of Schwandorf and the districts of Cham, Burglengenfeld, Nabburg, Oberviechtach, Roding, Waldmünchen, Vohenstrauß, and Neunburg vorm Wald. In the 1976 through 2017 elections, it comprised the district sof Schwandorf and Cham. It acquired its current borders in the 2021 election.

Members
The constituency has been held continuously by the Christian Social Union (CSU) since its creation. It was first represented by Karl Kahn from 1949 to 1957, followed by Hans Drachsler from 1957 to 1965. Alois Niederalt served one term from 1965 to 1969. Dionys Jobst was then representative from 1969 to 1998, a total of eight consecutive terms. Klaus Hofbauer served from 1998 to 2009. Karl Holmeier was elected in 2009 and re-elected in 2013 and 2017. He was succeeded by Martina Englhardt-Kopf in 2021.

Election results

2021 election

2017 election

2013 election

2009 election

References

Federal electoral districts in Bavaria
1949 establishments in West Germany
Constituencies established in 1949
Cham (district)
Schwandorf (district)
Regensburg (district)